Steer is a surname. Notable people with the surname include:

Bartholomew Steer (bap. 1568–1597), English rebel
Bill Steer (born 1969), British guitarist
Dugald Steer (born 1965), English writer
Frank Steer (1901–2006), American First World War veteran
Gary Steer (born 1970), English cricketer
George Steer (1909–1944), British journalist and soldier
Jed Steer (born 1992), English footballer
John Steer (1824–1918), English merchant
Irene Steer (1889–1947), Welsh swimmer
Michael Steer (born 1956), Australian academic
Philip Wilson Steer (1860–1942), British painter
Rene Steer (born 1990), English footballer
Ricardo Steer (born 1982), Colombian footballer
Serafina Steer (born 1982), English musician
Spencer Steer (born 1997), American baseball player
Stanley Steer (1900–1997), Anglican bishop
Teri Steer (born 1975), American shot putter
Trevor Steer (born 1938), Australian rules footballer
Vincent Steer, typographer
William Steer (1888–1969), English footballer
Kieran Steer (born 1995), Scottish Boccia Paralympian and Powerchair Footballer.

See also
Steer (disambiguation)
Steers (disambiguation)